Julien Temple (born 26 November 1953) is a British film, documentary and music video director. He began his career with short films featuring the Sex Pistols, and has continued with various off-beat projects, including The Great Rock 'n' Roll Swindle, Absolute Beginners and a documentary film about Glastonbury.

Early life
Temple was born in Kensington, London, the son of Landon Temple, who organised the travel company Progressive Tours.  He was educated at St Marylebone Grammar School (from which he was expelled), William Ellis School, and King's College, Cambridge. He grew up with little interest in film until, when a student at Cambridge, he discovered the works of French anarchist director Jean Vigo. This, along with his interest in the early punk scene in London in 1976, led to his friendship with The Sex Pistols, leading him to document many of their early gigs.

Career

1970s
Temple's first film was a short documentary called Sex Pistols Number 1, which set out to show the rise of the band from 1976–1977, in a series of short clips from television interviews and gigs. This led to Temple making The Great Rock And Roll Swindle, another documentary. As band members Johnny Rotten and Sid Vicious had left the band by this time, the story of the group is told from the viewpoint of their manager, Malcolm McLaren.

The Great Rock And Roll Swindle tells of the rise of The Sex Pistols, apparently as manipulated by McLaren, and how he had shaped the band throughout their short career. Many of the 'facts' given by McLaren were disputed by John Lydon (who had dropped the Johnny Rotten name after leaving the band), who accused McLaren of using the film to attack him personally. This helped split opinion on the film as, although it was praised for attempting to capture some of the punk scene of the time, it was seen as too skewed towards McLaren's vision. Controversy aside, Temple was praised for his mix of animated scenes, documentary footage, and specially shot footage which he used to tell McLaren's story. This helped launch Temple into a career making music videos, something for which he would be best known for much of his career.

1980s and 1990s
In 1983, Temple directed a film for the BBC Arena series called It's All True, named after the 1942 unfinished Orson Welles film. Compered by Welles himself, the film comprised many short segments about the state of the video industry, both real and imagined, many featuring cameos by celebrities including Mel Brooks, Grace Jones, Ray Davies, and Koo Stark. This was followed by Temple's next theatrical release, the short film Jazzin' for Blue Jean featuring David Bowie which was released as a support feature to The Company of Wolves. By 1985, Temple was now well known for being a director of successful music videos by the Kinks, The Rolling Stones, David Bowie and other British artists, several of which were early, groundbreaking, videos for the new MTV channel, but he was yet to direct a major film.

In 1986, Temple directed the film version of Colin MacInnes' book Absolute Beginners. One of the most expensive films in British history, the fate of the studios involved (as well as several careers) were dependent on the success of the film. The film was critically panned in the UK. As it was a musical, rather than a straight adaptation of the book, it was attacked for a lack of narrative; it was also called "a series of badly-linked music videos". Absolute Beginners was financially unsuccessful and was partly responsible for the Goldcrest company going bankrupt. Temple found himself being blamed personally for the failure. He moved to the United States, where he was offered the film Earth Girls Are Easy, as well as a series of music videos for such artists as Duran Duran, Janet Jackson, Neil Young and Tom Petty.

Temple returned to the UK in the late 1990s, where he continued to make films and music videos. Vigo: Passion for Life (1998) recounts the passionate relationship between French film maker Jean Vigo (1905–34) and his wife Lydou, who both suffered from tuberculosis. The film was not well received. A reviewer in Sight & Sound commented that the film "although absolutely faithful to the facts, is absolutely dreadful".

2000s
Films which followed included Pandæmonium (2001), a critically acclaimed film about the friendship between Romantic poets Samuel Taylor Coleridge and William Wordsworth, and The Filth and the Fury (2000), another documentary about The Sex Pistols. This time the film was made with the full cooperation of the surviving members of the band and told the story of the band from their viewpoint. This film mixed newly shot footage and interviews with footage culled from The Great Rock and Roll Swindle and previously unseen interviews. The film was a critical success and was seen as setting the record straight in regard to the history of The Sex Pistols.

Between 2002 and 2005, Temple completed a feature-length documentary about the Glastonbury Festival. This involved him shooting footage at the festival as well as drawing on the vast amount of archival footage, as well as footage sent in by fans of the festival. It was released in the UK in April 2006.

In 2006 (premiered January 2007), Temple made a film of the life of his friend, in Joe Strummer: The Future Is Unwritten.

In November 2007, Temple filmed several of the Sex Pistols' comeback shows at the Brixton Academy in London. This was followed by several filming sessions with each member of the band as they re-visited their old London haunts. The footage was assembled into a new documentary film released on DVD in 2008 as The Sex Pistols: There'll Always Be An England, bringing Temple's association with the Sex Pistols up to date.

In June 2008, Temple filmed three concerts by Madness at the Hackney Empire. These concerts were previews of the band's forthcoming album, The Liberty of Norton Folgate.

In 2009, Temple directed the third film in his punk trilogy, Oil City Confidential, which celebrated the Canvey Island legends Dr. Feelgood, and a hymn to the Motor City entitled Requiem For Detroit? (2010).

2010s
In 2010, Temple directed the biography Ray Davies: Imaginary Man. Previously, he had directed several Kinks videos. Also, he was referred to by name in The Kinks song Too Hot from their Word of Mouth album: "Julien's on the street today/ Scouting out locations..."

In 2011, Temple returned to Glastonbury to further document the legendary festival. The resulting 75 minute film, titled "Glastonbury After Hours: Glastopia", was shot on location in the Shangri-La, Arcadia, the Unfair Ground, Strummerville, Block 9 and the Common areas. It was premiered on BBC4 on 15 June 2012.

On 4 March 2013, it was announced that Jesse L. Martin would replace Lenny Kravitz as Marvin Gaye in Sexual Healing, directed by Temple, and produced by Vassal Benton and Fred Bestall. With approximately 70% of the film completed and only three weeks to go on a planned nine-and-a-half-week shoot, production was stopped on the biopic, primarily due to financial problems (crew members were said to have not been paid fully for their work on the film).

Personal life
With his wife, Amanda (Pirie) Temple, Temple has a daughter named Juno (born in 1989) and two sons, Leo (born 1993) and Felix (born 2000).

His sister, Nina Temple, was the last General Secretary of the Communist Party of Great Britain.

Filmography
 The Great Rock 'n' Roll Swindle (1979)
 UK Subs: Punk Can Take It (1979)
 Biceps of Steel (1980)
 The Secret Policeman's Other Ball (1982)
 It's All True (1983)
 Mantrap (1983)
 Absolute Beginners (1986)
 Running out of Luck (1987)
 Aria (segment Rigoletto) (1987)
 Earth Girls Are Easy (1988)
 Stones at the Max (1991)
 Bullet (1996)
 Vigo: Passion for Life (1998)
 The Filth and the Fury (2000)
 Pandæmonium (2000)
 Glastonbury (2006)
 Joe Strummer: The Future Is Unwritten (2007)
 The Sex Pistols: There'll Always Be An England (2008)
 The Eternity Man (2008)
 Oil City Confidential (2009)
 Requiem For Detroit (2009)
 Ray Davies - Imaginary Man (2010)
 Dave Davies - Kinkdom Come (2011)
 London: The Modern Babylon (2012)
 Glastonbury After Hours: Glastopia (2012)
 You Really Got Me (forthcoming)
 Rio 50 Degrees: Carry On CaRIOca (2014)
 The Clash: New Year's Day '77 (2015), largely at the official gala opening of The Roxy club on 1 January 1977
 The Ecstasy of Wilko Johnson (2015)
 The Origin of the Species (2016)
 Habaneros (2017)
 Ibiza: The Silent Movie (2019)
 Crock of Gold: A Few Rounds with Shane MacGowan (2020)
 Sexual Healing (post-production)

Music videos

References

External links
 
 Screenonline biography

1953 births
Living people
Alumni of King's College, Cambridge
English music video directors
Film directors from London
Glastonbury Festival
People from Kensington
People educated at St Marylebone Grammar School
People educated at William Ellis School
Sex Pistols